Kei Hosoya (細谷 圭, born January 17, 1988) is a Japanese former professional baseball infielder who is currently a coach for the Toyama GRN Thunderbirds of Baseball Challenge League. He has played in his entire career with the Nippon Professional Baseball (NPB) for the Chiba Lotte Marines.

Career

Playing career

On April 13, 2008, Hosoya made his NPB debut.

On December 2, 2020, Hosoya become a free agent. On December 26, 2020, Hosoya announced his retirement.

Coaching career
On December 26, 2020, Hosoya announced his retirement and also become coach for the Toyama GRN Thunderbirds of Baseball Challenge League.

References

External links

Kei Hosoya statistics on NPB.jp

1988 births
Living people
Baseball people from Gunma Prefecture
Chiba Lotte Marines players
Japanese baseball players
Nippon Professional Baseball first basemen
Nippon Professional Baseball shortstops
Nippon Professional Baseball third basemen